Archie McLean (1894–1971) was a mechanic and association football player from Paisley, Scotland who emigrated in 1912 to São Paulo, Brazil.

In São Paulo, McLean's football career flourished and he became known, on the pitch, as Veadinho (the little deer). Charles William Miller is commonly regarded as having introduced the sport to the country.

Early career 

McLean was a machine mechanic working for J & P Coats, a textile company.

McLean had played for the Ayr F.C. team that amalgamated with Ayr Parkhouse F.C. to form Ayr United, as well as for Galston and St Johnstone. With St Johnstone he had won the Consolation Cup in 1912.

Scottish Wanderers 

McLean was transferred to São Paulo in 1912. Initially he had planned for only a three-month stay.

Shortly after taking up residence there, McLean founded an ex-pats' football team, the Scottish Wanderers. They played in the local São Paulo State League.

McLean's performances caught the attention of the Brazilian public within a year. He was picked for the São Paulo state team against Rio de Janeiro.

Later career and death 

McLean's involvement at the highest level of Brazilian football ended in the mid-1920s.

McLean died of throat cancer at 77 years of age.

Footnotes

References 

 
 
 

1894 births
1971 deaths
Footballers from Paisley, Renfrewshire
Scottish footballers
Ayr F.C. players
St Johnstone F.C. players
Scottish expatriate footballers
Expatriate footballers in Brazil
Association footballers not categorized by position